Bolinda Publishing is a publishing house, based in Melbourne, Australia, best known for producing talking books in conjunction with several book publishers, including HarperCollins, Penguin and ABC, under their own and other imprints.

History
Bolinda was founded in Tullamarine, Victoria in 1986 as Australian Large Print Audio and Video Pty Ltd, supplying public libraries with their own editions of popular books in large print format (Bolinda Press) and spoken word on compact cassettes (Bolinda Audio). They have since opened offices in England, America and New Zealand.

Readers have included Tim Winton, for his own stories, Peter Combe reading classic fairy stories for children, and Dylan Alcott reading his memoir Able: Gold Medals, Grand Slams and Smashing Glass Ceilings.

Recognition
In 2011 Bolinda was shortlisted in the Australian Book Industry Awards in the category "Small Publisher of the Year"

Bolinda won 
AudioFile magazine's Earphones Award for Jim Daly's narration of Morris West's "The Lovers"
Audie Award for Audiobook of the Year in 2016 for The Water Diviner, read by Jack Thompson.
Audie Awards are bestowed by the Audio Publishers Association in a great number of categories. Others in which Bolinda have been successful are: Autobiography or Memoir, Best Male Narrator, Business and Personal Development, Faith-Based Fiction and Nonfiction, Fiction, Literary Fiction or Classics, Middle Grade Title, Mystery, Narration by the Author, Original Work, Short Stories or Collections, Thriller or Suspense, Young Adult Title, Young Listeners' Title.

References 

Audiobooks
Audiobook companies and organizations
1986 establishments in Australia